Fernando Martínez may refer to:

Fernando Martínez (baseball) (born 1988), Major League Baseball player
Fernando Martínez (runner) (born 1993), Mexican distance runner
Fernando Martínez Heredia (1939–2017), Cuban politician
Nando Martínez (Fernando Martínez Perales, born 1967), Spanish footballer
Fernando Martínez (Spanish footballer) (born 1990), Spanish footballer
Fernando Martínez (Mexican footballer) (born 1991), Mexican footballer
Fernando Martínez (boxer) (born 1991), Argentine boxer
Fernando Alejandre Martínez (born 1956), Spanish Army officer

See also
Fernando Martín (disambiguation)
Chito Martínez (footballer) (Fernando Rafael Martínez Silva, born 1977), Venezuelan footballer